John "Ike" Lloyd Powers (March 13, 1906 – December 22, 1968) was an American professional baseball player who played two seasons for the Philadelphia Athletics during  and , appearing in twenty games as a pitcher, all but one of those appearances being in relief. He was born in Hancock, Maryland and died there at the age of 62.

External links

Major League Baseball pitchers
Baseball players from Maryland
Philadelphia Athletics players
Martinsburg Blue Sox players
People from Hancock, Maryland
1906 births
1968 deaths